Shotguns That Kick is a 1914 comedy short starring Roscoe "Fatty" Arbuckle, Mabel Normand, and Arbuckle's acrobatic nephew Al St. John.  The film was directed by Arbuckle.

Cast
 Roscoe 'Fatty' Arbuckle
 Edward Dillon - (as Eddie Dillon)
 Mabel Normand
 Al St. John

See also
 List of American films of 1914
 Fatty Arbuckle filmography

External links

1914 films
Films directed by Roscoe Arbuckle
American silent short films
American black-and-white films
1914 comedy films
1914 short films
Silent American comedy films
American comedy short films
1910s American films